Burnt Hills-Ballston Lake Central School District is a school district headquartered in the Hostetter Leadership Center in Burnt Hills, a hamlet in Ballston, New York. In addition to the Town of Ballston (including the hamlets of Burnt Hills and Ballston Lake), it also serves Charlton, Clifton Park, and Glenville. Today, district enrollment typically hovers between 3,100 pupils to 3,200 pupils, with 400-500 students enrolled in each elementary school, approximately 800 students enrolled at Richard H. O'Rourke Middle School, and about 1,200 students enrolled at the high school.

History
The district was established in 1915 so residents could have their own local high school instead of paying to send their pupils to surrounding schools. It was formed out of three existing districts, each having one-room schoolhouses, making it the first consolidated school district in the state. Burnt Hills-Ballston Lake School of Agriculture & Homemaking was established in 1916 and the first high school graduation ceremony was held in 1920 for two pupils. In the early 1930s, the front facing side of what was then the Lakehill Road School, and is now Francis L. Stevens Elementary had burnt down, and was rescontructed. Fourteen additional districts joined in the period 1925 to 1962, all of which had one-room schoolhouses.

Many additional buildings were constructed throughout the 1950s. Pashley Elementary, the first building with the intent of teaching grades K-6 was built in 1951 following the post-war baby boom; at this point, many children continued to attend one room schoolhouses. In 1955, the BH-BL High School was built, and the Lakehill Road School was converted into Ballston Lake Elementary School (renamed Francis L. Stevens Elementary in 1967 to honor the district's first superintendent). Next, Glenhaven and Charlton Heights Elementary Schools were built, using the same design in order to save the district money.

In 1961, a final school was constructed, and the Junior High became the third building in the district on Lakehill Road. Throughout the 1960s, every building received a new addition to accommodate for the district's growing enrollment, which peaked at 5,467 students in 1970.

The 1980s and 1990s saw a few more major changes to the district. Sixth grade classes were moved from elementary schools to the Junior High School in 1988, and the building was modified to service pupils grades 6–8. Then, in 1994 the building was renamed to Richard H. O’Rourke Middle School, to honor a long-time superintendent upon his retirement. In 1981, Glenhaven Elementary was closed due to declining enrollment in the district. The space was renamed the Hostetter Administration & Leadership Center, and held the district's administrative office until a water main break led to extensive damage in 2009.

2013 Racism Incident
At the October 2013 homecoming football game against Amsterdam, six to twelve BH-BL students chanted the racial slur "Amsterico," aimed at Amsterdam's larger Latin American population (BH-BL is predominantly white) until the BH-BL head coach Matt Shell addressed the crowd and threatened to forfeit the game. After the game, the coach told reporters that "There's no place for it", but also said that "Kids are kids, and they get emotional."  The BH-BL administration apologized to Amsterdam, and promised to address "the recent situation with the entire student body" and use it as "an opportunity to increase our efforts in teaching students the importance of diversity and citizenship."

Schools
Secondary:
 Burnt Hills-Ballston Lake High School
 Richard H. O'Rourke Middle School
Primary:
 Charlton Heights Elementary School
 Pashley Elementary School
 Francis L. Stevens Elementary School

References

External links
 
 Burnt Hills-Ballston Lake Central School District at  NERIC

School districts in New York (state)
Education in Saratoga County, New York
School districts established in 1915